The Girl of the Limberlost is a 1945 American drama film starring Ruth Nelson, Dorinda Clifton, and Loren Tindall, and directed by Mel Ferrer. The film is based on a 1909 novel by Gene Stratton-Porter, which was previously filmed in 1909 as "A Girl of the Limeberlost".

The movie is set in Indiana's famous Limberlost Swamp, which was clear-cut, drained and turned into farmland in the early 20th century, despite efforts by Stratton-Porter and others to save it. A small part of the original swamp has been restored since the 1990s and is now a nature preserve.

Cast
 Ruth Nelson as Kate Comstock
 Dorinda Clifton as Elnora Comstock
 Loren Tindall as Pete Reed
 Gloria Holden as Miss Nelson
 Ernest Cossart as Roger Henley
 Vanessa Brown as Helen Brownlee
 James Bell as Wesley Sinton
 Joyce Arling as Margaret Sinton
 Charles Arnt as Hodges
 Warren Mills as Chester Hepple
 Gloria Patrice as Amy Thurston
 Lillian Bronson as Miss Blodgett
 Peggy Converse as Jessie Reed
 Jimmy Clark as Bob Stewart
 Carol Morris as Carrie

References

External links
 
 
 

Columbia Pictures films
1945 drama films
1945 films
American drama films
Films directed by Mel Ferrer
Films based on works by Gene Stratton-Porter
American black-and-white films
Films based on American novels
Remakes of American films
1940s American films